Benjamin Fain (March 25, 1903 – February 12, 1976) was an American bridge player. He was born in New York City and died in Houston, Texas.

Bridge accomplishments

Wins

 North American Bridge Championships (6)
 von Zedtwitz Life Master Pairs (1) 1955 
 Fall National Open Pairs (1) 1956 
 Senior and Advanced Senior Master Pairs (1) 1951 
 Mitchell Board-a-Match Teams (2) 1953, 1956 
 Reisinger (1) 1955

Runners-up

 North American Bridge Championships
 Reisinger (2) 1956, 1957

References

1903 births
1976 deaths
American contract bridge players
Sportspeople from New York City